AM PM may mean:

 ampm, a convenience store chain
 AM/PM (album), the debut studio album by American post-hardcore band The White Noise, released June 23, 2017
 AM PM (Dufresne album), the third album by Italian post-hardcore band Dufresne, released May 14, 2010
 AM:PM, the debut extended play by Indonesian singer-songwriter Stephanie Poetri, released March 12, 2021
 AM PM (Endorphin album), the third album by the Australian band Endorphin, released in 2002
 AM PM Records, the former dance division of A&M Records in England.

See also
 12-hour clock